Amis may refer to:

 Amis (surname)
 Amis people (or Amis), a tribe of Taiwanese aborigines
 Amis language, an indigenous language of Taiwan
 AMIS (ISP), an Internet service provider (ISP) in Slovenia and Croatia
 Amis et Amiles, an old French romance

The acronym AMIS may stand for:
 Association for Music in International Schools, an association "dedicated to the promotion of excellence in all levels of music education."
 African Union Mission in Sudan (AMIS)
 American Musical Instrument Society (AMIS)
 AMI Semiconductor, designer and manufacturer of silicon chips
 Atari Message Information System, a bulletin board system for 8-bit Atari computers
 Audio Messaging Interchange Specification, a method to move messages from one voice mail system to another
 Alternate Multiplex Interrupt Specification, a method of sharing a software interrupt by many TSR programs
 Abandoned Mines Information System, a database containing abandoned and inactive mines in Ontario, Canada
 Agricultural Market Information System, an initiative by the G20 states to analyse and forecast the situation on the global agricultural market

Language and nationality disambiguation pages